Kyaka is a town in Tanzania. It is an urban centre in Missenyi District, Kagera Region. The population of Kyaka was estimated at about 6,000 people in 2015.

Location
Kyaka is located in Missenyi District, in Kagera Region, in northwestern Tanzania, on the southern banks of the Kagera River. The geographical coordinates of Kyaka are:01°15'13.0"S, 31°25'12.0"E (Latitude:-1.253611; Longitude:31.420000).

Overview 
The Kyaka Bridge, sometimes referred to as Kagera Bridge, spans the Kagera River at Kyaka. At Kyaka, two major road systems intersect. Highway B8 (Mutukula–Bukoba Road) meets Highway B182 (Omurushaka–Kyaka Road).

History

In October 1978, about 3,000 Uganda Army troops loyal to dictator Idi Amin invaded Tanzania, starting with aerial bombings. After overwhelming the weak Tanzanian border defenses, the Ugandans occupied the area north of Kagera River, called the Kagera Salient, claiming it was Ugandan territory. They blew up the Kyaka Bridge and destroyed a lot of property.

As result of the invasion, the Uganda–Tanzania War erupted; the Ugandans were mostly expelled by the Tanzania People's Defence Force from the Kagera Salient in November 1978. Following the conclusion of the war, the Tanzanian Government increased the strength of its police station in Kyaka to better ensure border security.

See also
 Transport in Tanzania
 Uganda–Tanzania War

References

External links
 Weather Forecast At Kyaka, Tanzania

Geography of Tanzania
Missenyi District
Kagera Region
Cities in the Great Rift Valley
Populated places in Kagera Region